Älmhult Municipality (Älmhults kommun) is a municipality in central Kronoberg County in southern Sweden, where the town of Älmhult is seat.

In 1901 Älmhult was detached from Stenbrohult and made a market town (köping). The present municipality was created by the local government reform of 1971, when Älmhult was amalgamated with the surrounding rural municipalities.

Of historical significance is that the botanist Carl von Linné was born and grew up in the parish of Stenbrohult in the early 18th century. Today, the estate where he was born and lived his first months has been turned into a museum at Råshult, still surrounded by the same meadows and fields it was 300 years ago.

Allegedly, the area has a variety of different specimens of plants, likely to trigger the interest of a botanical minded youngster. The geography is probably not distinguished from its neighbouring municipalities however. Like all Småland municipalities they contain a variety of lakes, streams and above all forests.

The first IKEA store was opened in Älmhult, by Ingvar Kamprad. Ingvar grew up in the municipality.

Localities

There are 5 urban areas (also called a Tätort or locality) in Älmhult Municipality.

In the table the localities are listed according to the size of the population as of December 31, 2014. The municipal seat is in bold characters.

Notable natives
Carl Linnaeus
Ingvar Kamprad

References
Statistics Sweden

External links

Älmhult Municipality - Official site
Älmhult.com

Municipalities of Kronoberg County